Queen Elizabeth Provincial Park is a provincial park located  northwest of Grimshaw, in northern Alberta, west of the junction of Highway 2 and the Mackenzie Highway. It was named Lac Cardinal Provincial Park until 1 August 1978, when it was renamed Queen Elizabeth Provincial Park to commemorate the tour of the province by Queen Elizabeth II, Queen of Canada.

It was established on 1 March 1956 and is maintained by Alberta Tourism, Parks and Recreation.

Activities
The following activities are available in the park:
Beach activities (including swimming and volleyball)
Birdwatching (141 bird species have been observed)
Camping
Canoeing and kayaking
Cross-country skiing ( non-groomed trails)
Front country hiking
Horseshoes
Power boating, sailing, water-skiing and windsurfing

See also
List of provincial parks in Alberta
List of Canadian provincial parks
List of National Parks of Canada

References

External links

Provincial parks of Alberta
Municipal District of Peace No. 135